Wazirpur is an Upazila of Barisal District in the Division of Barisal, Bangladesh.

Geography 
It has 44,480 households and a total area of 248.35 km2.

Demographics 
According to the 1991 Bangladesh census, Wazirpur had a population of 227,115. Males constituted 50.8% of the population, and females 49.2%. The number of residents aged 18 or over was 114,254. Wazirpur has an average literacy rate of 47.7% (7+ years), compared to the national average of 32.4%. There are 22 colleges and 50 primary schools in Wazirpur.

Administration
Wazirpur Upazila is divided into nine union parishads: Bamrail, Barakotha, Guthia, Harta, Jalla, Otra, Satla, Shikarpur and Sholak. The union parishads are subdivided into 118 mauzas and 125 villages.

Notable residents 
 Major M. A. Jalil, freedom fighter and politician, was born at Wazirpur in 1942.
 Sardar Fazlul Karim, philosopher, was born at Atipara village in 1925.
 Manabendra Mukherjee (singer)

See also 
 Upazilas of Bangladesh
 Districts of Bangladesh
 Divisions of Bangladesh

References 

Upazilas of Barisal District
Barishal Division